Charles-Émilien Thuriet (5 October 1832, Baume-les-Dames – 8 December 1920, Turin) was a 19th–20th-century French writer and poet.

A magistrate by occupation, Thuriet was, with Charles Weiss, cofoundator of the Revue littéraire de la Franche-Comté.

Thuriet was an associated member of the Académie de Besançon.

Publications 

 Les procès s’en vont ! ou Essai sur les causes générales qui ont amené en France la diminution des procès civils,, Paris, Dumoulin, 1861.
 Revue littéraire de la Franche-Comté, Besançon, Outhenin Chalandre fils, 1863-1868.
 Traditions populaires de l’arrondissement de Poligny, Poligny, G. Mareschal, 1875.
 Traditions populaires du Jura, Poligny, Impr. G. Mareschal, 1877.
 Étude historique sur le bourg de Rougemont (Doubs), Besançon, Dodivers, 1877.
 La Chevalerie de Saint-Georges en Franche-Comté, Poligny, G. Mareschal, 1878.
 En Franche-Comté. Facéties, proverbes et types populaires, Poligny, G. Mareschal, 1879.
 Usages locaux ayant force de loi dans le département du Doubs, recueillis et coordonnés d’après les travaux de plusieurs commissions administratives…, Besançon, Ch. Marion, 1879.
 Contes populaires franc-comtois, [S. l.], 1880.
 Notice sur Richard-Baudin, Besançon, Dodivers, 1881.
 La Fileuse ; Le Très humble serviteur ; Entre la poire et le fromage : pièces de vers, Besançon, Dodivers, 1882.
 Causerie sur Charles Viancin, par M. Ch. Thuriet, mémoire lu à la séance publique de l’Académie de Besançon, le 26 janvier 1882, Besançon, Dodivers, 1882.
 La Ballade du cordier ; Une vieille figure comtoise, la mère Bouvet, Deux pièces de vers lues à la Société d’émulation du Doubs, 1884-1885, Besançon, Dodivers, 1885.
 La Fontaine de la Rochette, à Saint-Claude (Jura), pièce de vers de Charles Thuriet, lue à la Société d’émulation du Doubs, dans sa séance du 15 décembre 1886, Besançon, Dodivers, 1887.
 Notre-Dame des fleurs, et Une destinée, Besançon, P. Jacquin, 1888.
 Étude sur Marsoudet, poète franc-comtois avec fragments nouveaux et encore inédits, Besançon, P. Jacquin, 1888.
 Charles Nodier écrivain franc-comtois, Lons-le-Saunier, L. Declume, 1889.
 Traditions populaires du Doubs : région de Baume-les-Dames, Besançon, P. Jacquin, 1889.
 Saint-Claude et ses environs, Bourg-en-Bresse, Impr. Générale, 1890.
 Une visite au berceau et à la tombe de Lamartine, Besançon, P. Jacquin, 1890.
 Le Râteau ; Un électeur de 1848 à Besançon, anecdotes franc-comtoises dites à la Société d’émulation du Doubs en 1889, Besançon, Dodivers, 1890.
 Lamartine et la Franche-Comté, Besançon, Dodivers, 1891.
 Reine Cigale, récit extrait des notes d’un juge d’instruction. (juin 1891), Besançon, P. Jacquin, 1891.
 Deux causeries sur Lamartine : Visite au berceau et à la tombe ; Lamartine et la Franche-Comté, Baume-les-Dames, A. Broihier, 1891.
 Proverbes judiciaires, Paris, L. Lechevalier, 1891.
 Reine Cigale : récit extrait des notes d’un juge d’instruction, Besançon, P. Jacquin, 1891.
 L’Expiation, ou la Légende du sculpteur, Besançon, P. Jacquin, 1892.
 Le Testament du professeur, récit extrait des notes d’un juge de paix, Besançon, P. Jacquin, 1892.
 Une Franc-comtoise, lady Carswelle, Besançon, Millot frères, 1893.
 Anecdotes inédites ou peu connues sur Lamartine, Besançon, P. Jacquin, 1893.
 Dernier voyage de P. J. Proudhon à Besançon, Besançon, P. Jacquin, 1896.
 Une promenade de J.-J. Rousseau en 1765, Besançon, Dodivers, A. Cariage, 1897.
 Francis Wey et Charles Nodier (causerie), Besançon, Dodivers, 1897.
 Le Chevalier de La Rochelle, Besançon, P. Jacquin, 1898.
 Charmoille : histoire vraie, Besançon, Dodivers, 1898.
 Profil d’un ministre sous la Terreur, Besançon, Dodivers, 1899.
 Marie de Magdala (petit poème évangélique), Besançon, Dodivers, 1899.
 Guigue de Champvans, esquisse. (Mars 1900.), Besançon, P. Jacquin, 1900.
 Le Colonel Oudet, Besançon, P. Jacquin, 1901.
 Boncerf, portrait historique, Besançon, P. Jacquin, 1902.
 La Princesse d’azur (idylle indienne), Besançon, J. Dodivers, 1905.
 Guyétand du Mont Jura et le « Génie vengé », Besançon, Jacquin, 1905.
 Le Berceau de Gersen, Besançon, J. Dodivers, 1906.
 Souvenirs littéraires…, Besançon, J. Dodivers, 1907.
 Projet de bibliographie lamartinienne française-italienne, avec Camille Monnet, Lettre-préface de Charles Thuriet, Turin, S. Lattès, 1909.
 L’Orgue, Besançon, Dodivers, 1910.
 Traditions populaires de la Haute-Saône et du Jura, Marseille, Lafitte Repr., 1979.
 Traditions populaires du Doubs, Marseille, Laffitte, 1980.
 Histoire de Rougemont, Paris, Res universis, 1990.
 Traditions populaires de la Haute-Saône, Péronnas, Éd. de la Tour Gile, 2000.

External links 
 Charles-Émilien Thurier on data.bnf.fr

19th-century French poets
20th-century French poets
People from Doubs
1832 births
1920 deaths